The 12th constituency of the Hauts-de-Seine is a French legislative constituency in the Hauts-de-Seine département.  It is represented in the 15th legislature by Jean-Louis Bourlanges of the Democratic Movement.

Description

Hauts-de-Seine's 12th Constituency lies in the south east of the department.

Politically the seat has favoured the right, however it has elected left wing deputies on three occasions; 1967, 1981 and 2012.

Historic Representation

Election results

2022

 
 
 
 
 
 
 
 
|-
| colspan="8" bgcolor="#E9E9E9"|
|-

2017

 
 
 
 
 
 
|-
| colspan="8" bgcolor="#E9E9E9"|
|-

2012

 
 
 
 
 
 
|-
| colspan="8" bgcolor="#E9E9E9"|
|-

2007

 
 
 
 
 
 
|-
| colspan="8" bgcolor="#E9E9E9"|
|-

2002

 
 
 
 
 
|-
| colspan="8" bgcolor="#E9E9E9"|
|-
 
 

 
 
 
 
 

* Withdrew before the 2nd round

1997

 
 
 
 
 
 
 
 
|-
| colspan="8" bgcolor="#E9E9E9"|
|-
 
 

 
 
 
 
 

* RPR dissident

Sources

 Official results of French elections from 1998: 

12